Top of the Line may refer to:

 Top of the Line (Rittz album), 2016
 Top of the Line (Tito El Bambino album), 2006
 Top of the Line, album by Prince Phillip Mitchell, 1979
 Top of the Line, album by Patty Ryan, 1988
 "Top of the Line", song by Frankie J from Priceless, 2006